Vitomir is an old given name of Slavic origin.

The word is derived from two Proto-Slavic elements: vito which means "to rule" and mir which means "peace, world, prestige". The vit is also found in the name of the Slavic deity Svetovit.

Feminine forms include Vitomira and Witomira. Nicknames include Vito, Miro, Mirek, and Vitek.

Notable people with the name include:

Zygmunt Witymir Bieńkowski, Polish pilot and writer
Vito Dimitrijević, Yugoslavian footballer
Vitomir Lukić, Bosnian-Croat prose writer and pedagogue
Vitomir "Vito" Nikolić, Montenegrin poet and journalist
Vitomir Vutov, Bulgarian football goalkeeper
Vitomir Prodanov – Patriarch Vikentije, the fourth Partriach of the reunified Serbian Orthodox Church

See also

Slavic names

External links
 http://www.behindthename.com/name/vitomir

Slavic masculine given names
Croatian masculine given names
Bulgarian masculine given names
Czech masculine given names
Macedonian masculine given names
Montenegrin masculine given names
Slovak masculine given names
Slovene masculine given names
Polish masculine given names

Serbian masculine given names
Ukrainian masculine given names